Algae are a type of Protist.

Algae may also refer to:
Algae fuel, a biofuel
Algae eaters, species that feed on algae
Snow algae, cold-tolerant species of algae
Ice algae, algae that live in sea ice
AlgaeBase, a database of algae
Algae Lake, lake in Antarctica

See also
Algos
National Algae Association, a US trade organization for renewable energy

cs:Algae